Eblisia is a genus of beetles belonging to the family Histeridae.

The genus has almost cosmopolitan distribution.

Species:
 Eblisia bennigseni Bickhardt, 1912 
 Eblisia bicincta Cooman, 1941

References

Histeridae